The following is a list of dams in Kumamoto Prefecture, Japan.

List

See also

References 

Kumamoto